Tetrandromyces is a genus of fungi in the family Laboulbeniaceae. The genus contain 6 species.

References

External links
Tetrandromyces at Index Fungorum

Laboulbeniomycetes